Copy editing (also known as copyediting and manuscript editing) is the process of revising written material (copy) to improve readability and fitness, as well as ensuring that a text is free of grammatical and factual errors. The Chicago Manual of Style states that manuscript editing encompasses "simple mechanical corrections (mechanical editing) through sentence-level interventions (line, or stylistic, editing) to substantial remedial work on literary style and clarity, disorganized passages, baggy prose, muddled tables and figures, and the like (substantive editing)". In the context of print publication, copy editing is done before typesetting and again before proofreading. Outside traditional book and journal publishing, the term copy editing is used more broadly, and is sometimes referred to as proofreading, or the term copy editing sometimes includes additional tasks.

Although copy editors are generally expected to make simple revisions to smooth awkward passages, they do not have a license to rewrite a text line by line, nor do they prepare material on an author's behalf. Creating original content to be published under another person's name is called ghostwriting. Furthermore, copy editors are expected to query structural and organizational problems, but they are not expected to fix these problems. In addition, copy editors do not normally engage in developmental editing, which includes helping an author develop an idea into a publishable manuscript, overhauling a rough draft, identifying gaps in subject coverage, devising strategies for more-effective communication of content, and creating features to enhance the final product and make it more competitive in the marketplace.

In the United States and Canada, an editor who does this work is called a copy editor. An organization's highest-ranking copy editor, or the supervising editor of a group of copy editors, may be known as the copy chief, copy desk chief, or news editor. In the United Kingdom, the term copy editor is used, but in newspaper and magazine publishing, the term is subeditor (or sub-editor), commonly shortened to sub. In the context of the Internet, online copy refers to the textual content of web pages. Similar to print, online copy editing is the process of revising and preparing the raw or draft text of web pages for publication.

Copy editing has three levels: light, medium, and heavy. Depending on the budget and scheduling of the publication, the publisher will let the copy editor know what level of editing to employ. The chosen type of editing will help the copy editor prioritize their efforts.

Within copy editing, there is mechanical editing and substantive editing. Mechanical editing is the process of aligning a document with editorial or house style, keeping the preferred style and grammar rules of publication consistent across all content. Content editing, also known as substantive editing, is the editing of the material, including its structure and organization, to ensure internal consistency.

Practices

Mechanical editing 
Mechanical editing is the process of proofreading a piece of writing for consistency, either internally or in accordance with the publisher's house style. According to Einsohn, mechanical editors work with such things as the following:
 Abbreviations and acronyms
 Additional elements, such as charts, tables, and graphs
 Capitalization
 Footnotes and endnotes
 Hyphenation
 Italicization (appropriate use of emphasis (italic or bold); appropriate choice of broad typeface category (italic, roman, other), especially in mathematical or scientific texts)
 Numbers and numerals
 Punctuation
 Quotations
 Spelling

Gilad also mentions the following:
 Initialisms
 Page numbers, headers, and footers
 Underscoring

Proper spelling and punctuation are subjective in some cases, where they must be left to the discretion of the copy editor or the publisher. Most publishing firms use a widely recognized style guide such as the New Oxford Style Manual, The Chicago Manual of Style and The Canadian Style. Companies that produce documents and reports but do not consider themselves publishers in the usual sense tend to rely on in-house style guides or on the judgment of the copyeditor.

Grammar and usage 
The goal of the copy editor is to enforce inviolable rules while respecting personal stylistic preferences. This can be difficult, as some writers view grammatical corrections as a challenge to their intellectual ability or professional identity. Therefore, copy editors are encouraged to respect the author's preference if it is acceptable. This practice is complicated further by volatile language conventions as recorded by books on grammar and usage, the authors of which often disagree.

Content editing 
Content editing consists of reorganizing or restructuring a document. This involves any inconsistent parts of the content as well as any variances. Content editors can fix the content by either rewriting it or heavily editing it. However, the copy editor will often point out any difficult passages for the author to resolve on his or her own time.

Although copy editors are not responsible for factual correctness of the document, they can provide comments for the author on any information that they know to be untrue, such as year discrepancies or misleading ideas. Such fact-checking is acceptable for copy editors who know the document's subject matter.

The copy editor must also point out any biased language without infringing on the author's meaning. This includes material "that might form the basis for a lawsuit alleging libel, invasion of privacy, or obscenity". Some see censoring biased language as political correctness, so it is important that the copy editor distinguish between the two. To do this, the copy editor will permit intentional "politically incorrect" views and censor only marginalized, offensive, or exclusive language.

Correlating parts, typecoding, and permissions 
Most manuscripts will require the copy editor to correlate the parts within it. Copy editors must carry out the following tasks in this process:
 Verify any cross-references that appear in the text
 Check the numbering of footnotes, endnotes, tables, and illustrations
 Specify the placement of tables and illustrations
 Check the content of the illustrations against the captions and the text
 Read the list of illustrations against the illustrations and captions
 Read the table of contents against the manuscript
 Read the footnotes/endnotes and in-text citations against the bibliography
 Check the alphabetization of the bibliography or reference list
 
Some manuscripts may require special cross-checking. For example, in a how-to text, a copy editor might need to verify that the list of equipment or parts matches the instructions given within the text.
 
Typecoding is the process of identifying which sections of the manuscript are not regular running text. These portions of text, known as elements, include the following:
 Part and chapter numbers
 Titles and subtitles
 Headings and subheadings
 Lists
 Extracts
 Displayed equations
 Table numbers
 Source lines
 Footnotes
 Figure numbers and captions

It is the copy editor's job to typecode (or make note of) all manuscript elements for the publication designer. Hard-copy copy editors are usually asked to pencil in the typecodes in the left margin of the manuscript. On-screen copy editors may be asked to insert typecodes at the beginning and end of each element.

Finally, if the manuscript contains long quotations from a published work that is still under copyright, the copy editor should remind the author to acquire permission to reprint those quotations. The same goes for the reprinting of tables, charts, graphs, and illustrations that have appeared in print. Rules vary for the reproduction of unpublished materials (letters, diaries, etc.)

Processes 
There are basic procedures that every copy editor must follow: copy editors need a system for marking changes to the author's text (marking), a process for querying the author and the editorial coordinator (querying), a method for keeping track of editorial decisions (recordkeeping), and procedures for incorporating the author's review of the copyediting into a final document (cleanup). These systems were originally developed in an era before that of the computer, but over time these procedures were adapted for a digital on-screen space.

Each medium (in print and on screen) has its own affordances, and although a copy editor may prefer one editing process over the other, copy editors are practically required to use both techniques.

Hard-copy editing 
Traditional markup copyediting, or hard-copy editing, is still important because screening tests for employment may be administered in hard copy. Also, the author whose text the copy editor is editing may prefer hard-copy markup, and copy editors need to know traditional markup in case documents and materials cannot be exchanged electronically. When editing in hard copy, all participating parties (the editor, author, typesetter, and proofreader) must understand the marks the copy editor makes, and therefore a universal marking system that signifies these changes exists. This is also why the copy editor should write legibly and neatly. Copy editors working hard copy write their corrections in the text directly, leaving the margins for querying. Usually, the copy editor is asked to write in a bright color so that the author and other parties can easily recognize the editor's changes.

On-screen editing 
Every year, more editing projects are being done on computers and fewer in print. Also, if there is a digital version of a text the copy editor is editing, they can more easily search words, run spell checkers, and generate clean copies of messy pages. The first thing copy editors must do when editing on screen is to copy the author's files, as the original document must be preserved. Each word-processing program provides various options for how an editor's markups are shown on screen and on the printout. On-screen editing mainly differs from hard-copy editing in the fact that the copy editor should edit more cleanly on screen, refraining from saving parts of words, and be careful in maintaining proper line spacing.

Querying 
Copy editors often need to query their authors in order to address questions, comments, or explanations: most of these can be done in the margins of the text, or the comment section when on screen. The copy editor must consider when to query and the length and tone of their queries, as querying too often or seldom, cryptically, or sarcastically can result in a negative relationship between the copy editor and the author.

Goals 
A copy editor's goals may change depending on the publication for which they work; however, there are a few constituencies which must always be served – the author (the person who wrote or compiled the manuscript), the publisher (the person or company which pays for production), and the readers (the audience for whom the material is being produced). These parties (together with the copy editor) work to achieve the same goal, which is to produce an error-free publication and improve the reader experience, by reducing extraneous cognitive load. The copy editor strives to improve clarity, coherence, consistency, and correctness – otherwise known as the "4 Cs", each of which serves the copy editor's "cardinal C", which is communication.

History 
The biggest difference between monastic copyists and copyeditors is that copyeditors leave edits as suggestions that can be rejected by the writer. These printing houses established procedures for editing, preparing the text, and proofreading. Specialist correctors ensured that texts followed the standards of the time.

Before the printing press, monastic copyists altered words or phrases they thought were odd, under the assumption that the copyist before them had made a mistake. This is what led to so much variety in standard texts like the Bible.

After the globalization of the book from 1800 to 1970 came the rise of American writers and editors. One editor in particular, Maxwell Perkins, was sought out by writers such as Fitzgerald, Hemingway, and Wolfe because he greatly improved the work of these prominent authors with his editorial eye. Perkins was known for editing, guiding, and befriending his writers – but the times were changing.

In the late 19th century, the role of an editor was to decide if a manuscript was good enough to be published. As time passed, the role of an editor and publisher became more distant. Although there was a newfound relationship between editors and authors, thoughtful editing did not end.

Copyeditors were employed at various publishing houses, magazines, journals, and by private authors seeking revisions to their work. Some copyeditors were even employed by public relations and advertising firms who valued strong editing practices in their business.

The symbols used by copyeditors today are based on those that have been used by proofreaders since the beginnings of publishing, though they have undergone some changes over time. However, the exact beginnings of the copyediting language used today are unclear. Despite its long history, copyediting as a practice has not experienced any extreme upheaval other than the desktop publishing revolution of the 1980s. This phenomenon began as the result of a series of inventions that were released during the middle of this decade, and refers to the growth of technology usage in the field of copyediting. Namely, the development of the Macintosh computer, the desktop laser printer by Hewlett-Packard, and software for desktop publishing called PageMaker allowed the revolution to begin. By allowing both individuals and publishing agencies alike to cheaply and effectively begin to edit compositions entirely on-screen rather than by hand, desktop publishing revolution morphed copyediting into the practice it is today. Most copyeditors today rely on more modern WYSIWYG (what you see is what you get) text processors such as Microsoft Word that are based on the original PageMaker to do their work.

There were a few events that led to changes within copyediting as a career. One of these, the successful strike of the editorial department of the Newark Ledger from November 17, 1934, to March 28, 1935, was "the first major action of its kind by any local guild ... [it] both confirmed the irreversibility of the guilds' movement away from the professional association idea and greatly accelerated that process". Paired with another string of strikes led by The New York Newspaper Guild against a number of smaller newspapers in the summer of 1934, these actions served to shift the image of the editorial worker as a "professional" to one as an average citizen. Another strike from the year 1934 was the strike at the Macaulay Company, reportedly the first-ever strike to occur at a publishing firm. At the conclusion of the second Macaulay strike, which occurred three months after the first, the nationwide drive towards unionization had entered the publishing industry and was "sweeping through all the major publishing houses". As these events seemed to have the secondary result of lowering the status of editors across the various publishing fields, it could be said that they sparked the decline of copyeditors, which can be seen across the publishing fields today.
 
Owing to the rise of the Digital Age, the roles and responsibilities of a copyeditor have changed. For instance, beginning in 1990, copyeditors learned pagination electronically. They could now look at different pages of a text on multiple screens and easily edit on there, as opposed to pasting them by hand onto a board. This technological advance also required that copyeditors learn new software such as Adobe Indesign, Quark Express, Affinity Publisher or Scribus.

Modern copyeditors are often required to edit for digital as well as print versions of the text. Digital copyediting requires copyeditors to understand RSS feeds, social media such as Twitter and Facebook, and HTML. What should be accounted for is that in this digital age, information is constantly being released, which leads to the decline in the editing of the online versions. Editors of the website BuzzFeed commented that sometimes they "simply can't get every post before it's published".
While copyeditors still do traditional tasks such as checking for facts, grammar, style, and writing headlines, some of their duties have been pushed aside to make way for technology. Some copyeditors now have to design page layouts and some even edit video content. Copyeditors are now sometimes referred to as "copy/layout editors" or "producers/designers".

Changes in the field 
 
Traditionally, the copy editor would read a printed or written manuscript, manually marking it with editor's "correction marks". At sizable newspapers, the main copy desk was often U-shaped; the copy desk chief sat in the "slot" (the center space of the U) and was known as the "slot man", while copy editors were arrayed around him or her on the outside of the U, known as the "rim". In the past, copy editors were sometimes known humorously as "rim rats". Chief copy editors are still sometimes called "the slot". But nowadays, the manuscript is more often read on a computer display and text corrections are entered directly.

The nearly universal adoption of computerized systems for editing and layout in newspapers and magazines has also led copy editors to become more involved in the design and the technicalities of production. Technical knowledge is therefore sometimes considered as important as writing ability, though this is truer in journalism than it is in book publishing. Hank Glamann, the co-founder of the American Copy Editors Society, made the following observation about ads for copy editor positions at American newspapers:
We want them to be skilled grammarians and wordsmiths and write bright and engaging headlines and must know Quark. But, often, when push comes to shove, we will let every single one of those requirements slide except the last one because you have to know that in order to push the button at the appointed time.

Traits, skills, and training
Besides an outstanding command of the language, copy editors need broad general knowledge for spotting factual errors; good critical thinking skills in order to recognize inconsistencies or vagueness; interpersonal skills for dealing with writers, other editors, and designers; attention to detail; and a sense of style. They must also set priorities and balance a desire for perfection with the need to meet deadlines.

Many copy editors have a college degree, often in journalism, communications, or the language of the writing that they edit. In the United States, copy editing is often taught as a college journalism course, though its name varies. The courses often include news design and pagination.

In the United States, The Dow Jones Newspaper Fund sponsors internships that include two weeks of training. Also, the American Press Institute, the Poynter Institute, the University of North Carolina at Chapel Hill, UC San Diego Extension, and conferences of the American Copy Editors Society offer midcareer training for newspaper copy editors and news editors (news copy desk supervisors).

Most US newspapers and publishers give copy-editing job candidates an editing test or a tryout. These vary widely and can include general items such as acronyms, current events, math, punctuation, and skills such as the use of Associated Press style, headline writing, infographics editing, and journalism ethics.

There are no official bodies offering a recognized proof-reading qualification in either the US or the UK. In the UK, the National Council for the Training of Journalists also has a qualification for subeditors.

Contemporary 
Before the digital era, copy editors would mark errors and inconsistencies with a red pen, using a markup language of symbols which were universally known. The traditional copy editor was once defined as editing for grammar, spelling, punctuation, and other mechanics of style.

Copy-editing symbols cannot be used in digital editing because they are not supported by tools such as track changes. With more posting online and less printing on paper, hard-copy can no longer keep pace with digital publishing. For a publisher to hire copy editors to print a hard copy, make edits, and then make changes is no longer the most efficient process. The position of copy editors is at risk because software can correct grammatical errors more quickly and cheaply.

Professionals feared that the introduction of digital editing software would end copyediting careers. Copy editors are still employed and needed for heavy edits, such as fact-checking and content organization, which are beyond the abilities of the software. With grammar software and journalists who can edit, copy editors are seen as a luxury in publishing. The potential for a company to use editing software may also require the copy editor to only perform heavy editing and querying. Though the steps for copyediting are the same, the execution has been adapted for digital environments.

The technological development of cloud storage allows contemporary copy editors and writers to upload and share files across multiple devices. Online word processors such as Google Docs, Dropbox, Zoho, OpenGoo and Buzzword allow users to perform a number of tasks. Each processor has its advantages and disadvantages based on the users' preferences, but primarily allows users to share, edit and collaborate on documents. Recently, OpenGoo has been rebranded as Feng Office  On Google Docs users can invite others via email to view, comment, and edit any file of their choosing. Those invited can view and edit the document together in real time. Unlike Google Docs whose files can only be shared through the web app, Dropbox shares from a desktop app. Dropbox users can share documents as links or as shared folders. Users can create shared folders and add others to the folder. Files in a shared folder will appear in the other user's Dropbox and all involved users receive notifications when edits are made to a file in the folder. Adobe's Buzzword allows users to share files, with the user's choice from varying levels of editing access and includes a version history feature which tracks changes made to documents and lets users revert to earlier versions. 
Useful in many word processors, a track changes feature allows users to make changes to a document and view them separately from the original document. In Microsoft Word, users can choose whether to show or hide changes by clicking track changes under the Review ribbon. Those editing documents can leave comments by clicking wherever the user desires to leave a comment and clicking New Comment under the review ribbon or by highlighting text and clicking New Comment. Users can apply revisions and choose which level of markups to view under the Show Markup dropdown menu in the Review ribbon. Users can also choose to accept or reject changes by clicking either Accept or Reject in the Review Ribbon.

Contemporary copy editor 
The field of copy editing is not obsolete. Teresa Schmedding, president of the American Copy Editors Society (ACES) and a deputy managing editor at the Daily Herald in Chicago, thinks that copy editors are "a natural fit" for digital journalism and social media because, though publishing has been made available to almost anyone, quality and credibility is brought to content only by copy editors.

Copy editors must now consider multimedia aspects of the story, such as video, images, audio, and search engine optimization, which may be included in digital publications. Digital editing now requires copy editors to understand SEO, HTML, CSS, and RSS feeds, as well as creative tools like Adobe Illustrator.

Issues 
One of the problems with copy-editing is that it may slow the publication of the text. With the digital publishing era came an increased demand for a fast turnover of information. Additional details such as color printing, page size, and layout are determined by the allotted budget. Web-based publications, such as BuzzFeed and Slate, do not have enough room in their budgets to keep sufficient staff to edit their massive, daily rushes of content. Therefore copy chief Emmy Favila says lower-priority posts are published without copyedits at Buzzfeed. Slate does not edit its blog posts before publication, but all of its news articles are copy edited before publication, say Slate copy chief Lowen Liu and deputy editor Julia Turner.

In response to such high demands for fast-produced content, some online publications have started publishing articles first and then editing later, a process known as back-editing. Editors prioritize stories to edit based on traffic and whether the content was originally reported for needing edits.

Reading material has become increasingly accessible to users with a wide range of disabilities. Carolyn Rude exemplifies such cases in alternatively replacing illustrations with text and audio translations for the visually impaired. Rude also suggests that web developers attempt to stick to print guidelines, such as "clear and simple language and consistent terms and navigation devices", especially when readers are looking at text in a second language.

Effects of the Internet

As online resources rise in popularity, copy editors endeavor to meet the increase of digital consumerism to the best of their abilities, and such high competition has resulted in a gradually "declining of quality in editing", such as copy editing or fact-checking. However, this doesn't mean that the Internet has limited the scope of a copy editor's responsibilities or job opportunities. One of the most important advancements of the digital age is the advent of pagination, which gives copy editors more control over the construction and revisions of their content, pagination is a convenient feature in modern software. Despite the increasing number of programs, however, some copy editors believe their basic functions and duties haven't changed much. Other copy editors think that the Internet has simplified fact-checking and that websites such as Facebook or Twitter have aided information-gathering. Other digital skills, such as image selection and search engine optimization, increase the visibility of search results, especially when searching for keywords in headlines.

In all likelihood, the Internet will continue to evolve, but this shouldn't hamper the overall importance of copy editing. Although it may be tempting to neglect proper revisions in favor of convenience, the credibility and quality of an editor's work should still be maintained, as there will always be updates in software and technology. As formats evolve, so too will the opportunities for journalists and other writers.

See also

Notes

References 
 Anderson, Laura. McGraw-Hill's Proofreading Handbook. 2nd edn. New York: McGraw-Hill, 2006.
 Baskette, Floyd K. & Sissors, Jack Z. & Brooks, Brian S. The Art of Editing. 8th edn. Allyn & Bacon, 2004.
 Rewritten and updated: Brian S. Brooks and James L. Pinson. The Art of Editing in the Age of Convergence, 11th edn. Routledge, 2017.
 
 Einsohn, Amy. The Copyeditor's Handbook: A Guide for Book Publishing and Corporate Communications. 2nd edn. Berkeley: University of California Press, 2006.
 
 Judd, Karen. Copyediting: A Practical Guide. 3rd edn. Menlo Park, CA: Crisp Learning, 2001.
 Norton, Scott. Developmental Editing: A Handbook for Freelancers, Authors, and Publishers. Chicago: University of Chicago Press, 2009.
 Rude, Carolyn D. (2006). Technical editing. Dayton, David., Maylath, Bruce. 4th edn. New York: Longman. . OCLC 60188071.
 Saller, Carol Fisher. The Subversive Copy Editor: Advice from Chicago (or, How to Negotiate Good Relationships with Your Writers, Your Colleagues, and Yourself). Chicago: University of Chicago Press, 2009.
 Ó Brógáin, Séamas. A Dictionary of Editing. Dublin: Claritas, 2015. .
 Smith, Peggy. Mark My Words: Instruction and Practice in Proofreading. 3rd edn. Alexandria, VA: EEI Press, 1997.
 Stainton, Elsie Myers. The Fine Art of Copyediting. 2nd edn. New York: Columbia University Press, 2002.
 Stroughton, Mary. The Copyeditor's Guide to Substance and Style. 3rd edn. Alexandria, VA: EEI Press, 2006.

 
Technical communication
Writing occupations
Journalism occupations
Types of editors